Beacon Charter High School for the Arts is a charter high school in Woonsocket, Rhode Island that first opened in 1997.

It combines a high school college preparatory program with a visual, performing, and culinary arts. In September 2015, Beacon opened Founders Academy, serving grades 6–8.

References

External links
 Beacon Charter High School for the Arts

Public high schools in Rhode Island
Schools in Providence County, Rhode Island
Charter schools in Rhode Island
1997 establishments in Rhode Island